Norman Louis Knight (September 21, 1895 – April 19, 1972) was an American chemist and writer of fantasy and science fiction. His most prominent work is probably A Torrent of Faces, a novel cowritten with James Blish and reprinted in the Ace Science Fiction Specials line/

Biography
Knight was born at St. Joseph, Missouri on September 21, 1895 at 2109 Messanie Road with his father Louis Ruthven Knight, and his mother Mary E. Knight (née Stauber). Norman's father was a druggist, and the family lived over the family drug store.

While not much of his fiction is remembered today, it was noticed during original publication. Particularly the short story Saurian Valedictory, published in Astounding Science Fiction, January 1939, was praised by famous science fiction couple Edmond Hamilton and Leigh Brackett, who made a comment that "It was a brilliant achievement and nobody seems to have heard of it, or him. It was an attempt to depict a reptilian civilization before Man. It succeeded triumphantly; the values were all so different, the psychology", and described it as "One of the really great stories on alien mentality".

Knight was a young man in St Joseph, Missouri in the early part of the 20th century. He joined the US Army Signal Corps in 1917, and was sent to France where his initial service was interrupted with a hospital; stay due to influenza.  Upon release he was delivering messages between commands via horseback.  When Knight was released from service after the war, his first job was with the nascent National Weather Service in Davenport, Iowa, where at a Summer picnic, he met Marie Sarah Yenn, who was to become his wife.  They had one child, a girl named Paula Marie.

References

Notes

Bibliography

 Clute, John and Peter Nicholls. The Encyclopedia of Science Fiction. New York: St. Martin's Griffin, 1995. .

External links
 

20th-century American chemists
1895 births
1972 deaths
American science fiction writers
American male novelists
20th-century American novelists
20th-century American male writers
Chemists from Missouri